Waldemar José Cerrón Rojas (19 March 1972) is a Peruvian professor and a politician.

Biography
Cerrón was born on 19 March 1972 in Chupaca, Junín. He is the son of Jaime Cerrón Palomino and Bertha Rojas López, two university professors. His brother is politician Vladimir Cerrón. Cerrón is licensed to teach both pedagogy and humanities. He received a doctorate in the educational sciences at the National University of the Center of Peru.

Political career
Cerrón joined the Socialist Party in 2007. In 2008, he was one of the founders of the Free Peru party, where he was the national economic secretary. After Free Peru member and congressman Álex Paredes González retired, Cerrón was elected as the spokesman of the party.

After Pedro Castillo attempted to dissolve congress Waldemar Cerrón stayed quiet in the immediate aftermath, although he did vote to remove Castillo, and later voiced support for Dina Boluarte. In March 2023, Cerrón introduced a bill which proposed that preventive detention be limited to only 12 months, which was seen as some to be an attempt to free Castillo, who was in prison for 12 months.

As a congressman 
In the 2021 Peruvian general election, Cerrón was elected to the Congress of the Republic of Peru with 25,281 votes. Cerrón criticized Pedro Castillo's cabinet, with Mirtha Vásquez as the president of the Council of Ministers.

Controversies

Money laundering
Waldemar, with his brothers Vladimir and Fritz, were investigated for money laundering in Junín. They are still under investigation.

References

Peruvian politicians
1972 births
Living people